The Arc New York (previously known as the NYSARC) is the largest organization serving people with developmental disabilities.  A non-profit, The Arc New York serves over 60,000 people with intellectual and other developmental disabilities through its 55 chapters in New York state. The Arc New York is an affiliated member of Arc of the United States.

History

In 1949, two Bronx mothers placed an advertisement in the New York Post with an interest in establishing a day nursery for their young children. Over 200 New York City parents responded and banded together to fight for the recognition of their children's special needs and capabilities.

A committee was appointed to draft a constitution for a new, single organization. The Arc New York was formally incorporated in February 1949.

In March of the same year, new committees were formed to address specific issues such as education, legal affairs, fundraising, and public relations. That same month, the Organization published the first issue of "Our Children's Voice" which later became "Our Voice Today." It was designed to communicate with other parents and families.

The Arc New York model has since served as a unique and effective organizational model that has been duplicated across the nation. In the years since its founding, the Organization has grown rapidly as a service provider and advocacy organization.

The Arc New York partners with Camp Loyal Town, Advantage Care Diagnostic and Treatment Center, Brookville Center for Children's Services, the AHRC Foundation and Fay J. Linder Center for Autism and Developmental Disabilities.

Mission

The Arc New York's mission is to improve the quality of life for persons with intellectual and other developmental disabilities by:
 Being the preferred place for support, information, direction, and services for persons with intellectual and other developmental disabilities;
 Having the best in service delivery;
 Speaking with one clear voice in all matters;
 Becoming a learning organization by building training and educational opportunities into all aspects of The Arc New York operations.

Chapters

Central Region
 Broome-Tioga-Chenango: Achieve
 Chemung: Chemung ARC
 Delaware: The Arc of Delaware County
 Herkimer: HARC
 Jefferson: Jefferson Rehabilitation Center
 Madison-Cortland: Madison Cortland ARC
 Oneida-Lewis: The Arc, Oneida Lewis, NYSARC
 Onondaga: Onondaga Arc
 Oswego: The ARC of Oswego
 Otsego: The Arc Otsego
 Rome Tri-County: Rome DC ARC
 St-Lawrence: St. Lawrence NYSARC

Northeast Region
 Albany: New Visions
 Clinton: Clinton ARC
 Columbia: COARC
 Essex: Mountain Lake Services
 Franklin-Hamilton: The Adirondack Arc
 Fulton: Lexington Center
 Montgomery: Liberty Arc
 Rensselaer: The Arc of Rensselaer County
 Saratoga: Saratoga Bridges
 Schenectady: Schenectady ARC
 Schoharie: Schoharie County ARC
 Warren-Washington: Warren Washington ARC

Southeast Region
 Staten Island: Benevolent Society
 Bronx: Bronx DC ARC
 Wassaic: Community Leaque Wassaic DC ARC
 Dutchess: Dutchess ARC
 Nassau: AHRC Nassau
 New York City: AHRC New York City
 Orange: Orange County AHRC
 Putnam: PARC
 Rockland: ARC of Rockland
 Suffolk: AHRC Suffolk
 Sullivan: Sullivan Arc
 Ulster-Greene: Ulster-Greene ARC
 Letchworth Village: Welfare League DC ARC
 Westchester: Westchester Arc

Western Region
 Allegany: Allegany Arc
 Cattaraugus: The ReHabilitation Center
 Chautauqua: The Resource Center
 Erie: Heritage Centers
 Genesee: Genesee ARC
 Livingston-Wyoming: Livingston Wyoming Arc
 Monroe: The Arc of Monroe County
 Niagara: Opportunities Unlimited
 Ontario: Ontario ARC
 Orleans: The Arc of Orleans County
 Schuyler: The Arc of Schuyler
 Seneca-Cayuga: Seneca-Cayuga Arc
 Steuben: The Arc of Steuben
 Wayne: The Arc of Wayne
 West Seneca: West Seneca DC ARC
 Yates: The Arc of Yates

Services

The Arc New York's 55 chapters provide a variety of services, including:
 Advocacy
Support offered on behalf of a family or individual.

 Children's Services
Services from birth through school age including diagnosis, evaluation, treatment, and education.

 Clinic
Clinical services and/or primary health care.

 Day Service
Activities that combine diagnostic, therapeutic, rehabilitative, pre-vocational, vocational, and employment services.

 Guardianship
Planning alternative granting of legal authority.

 Recreation
Day, evening, weekend, or overnight programs that provide leisure and social activities.

 Residential
Support services to enable living as independently as possible in the community.

 Support
Assistance in accessing needed services, programs and supports.

 Waiver
A flexible group of supports and services.

Trust services

The Arc New York currently offers 3 types of trust programs:

 The Arc New York Trust
The Arc New York Trust consists of two active funds. The Unrestricted Fund allows parents, relatives, and friends to leave large sums of money or property to help a person with a developmental disability. Funds can be transferred during the Grantor's life or at death. The Exempt Fund primarily benefits and supports the Arc New York Corporate Guardianship Program.

 The Arc New York Community Trusts
The Community Trusts are pooled trusts which qualify as Supplemental Needs Trusts for people with disabilities as described under Social Security Law Section 1614(a)(3)[42 USC 1382c(a)(3)]. They are funded with the personal assets of the person with disabilities.

Community Trust II is designed for individuals who have monthly income in excess of the Medicaid qualification levels.

Community Trust I and III are primarily for individuals receiving government benefits, like Supplemental Security Income or Medicaid. Community Trust III is solely for individuals with a large sum greater than $250,000.

 The Arc New York Individual Trust
The Arc New York Individual Trust offers both Trustee and administrative services for first- and third-party Supplemental Needs Trusts. Like the Community Trusts, the Individual Trust is open to people who have any disabilities listed under Security Law Section 1614(a)(3)[42 USC 1382c(a)(3)].

References 

Non-profit organizations based in New York (state)
Organizations established in 1949